The UMBC Retrievers women's volleyball program represents the University of Maryland, Baltimore County in NCAA Division I women's volleyball.
On February 19, 2018, UMBC hired former Duke Blue Devils assistant coach Cristina Robertson as the sixth head coach in the program's 45-year history.

See also
List of NCAA Division I women's volleyball programs

References 

College women's volleyball teams in the United States
University of Maryland, Baltimore County